Chandrayangutta Assembly constituency is a constituency of Telangana Legislative Assembly, India. It is one of 15 constituencies in Capital city of Hyderabad. It is part of Hyderabad Lok Sabha constituency.

Akbaruddin Owaisi, floor leader of AIMIM in Telangana Legislative Assembly is representing the constituency for the fourth time.

Extent of the constituency
The Assembly Constituency presently comprises the following neighbourhoods:

Members of Legislative Assembly 
Members of Legislative State Assembly, who represented Chandrayangutta.

Election Results

Telangana Legislative Assembly election, 2018

Telangana Legislative Assembly election, 2014

Trivia
 Mohd. Amanullah Khan, founder of Majlis Bachao Tehreek served the constituency for five terms as he won four times as Majlis candidate and one time as MBT Candidate.
 Since then Akbaruddin Owaisi is representing the constituency, AkbarUddin Owaisi is the Floor Leader of MIM In Telangana assembly.
 MIM and MBT have a strong rivalry in the constituency.

See also
 Chandrayangutta
 List of constituencies of Telangana Legislative Assembly

References

Assembly constituencies of Telangana